Leo Jerome Crowe (April 2, 1912 – April 24, 1966) was an American professional basketball player. He played in the National Basketball League for the Indianapolis Kautskys and averaged 6.2 points per game. He was also a long-time high school basketball coach spanning tenures in Indiana, Pennsylvania, and Rhode Island. In 1940–41, Crowe led Huntington (IN) Catholic High School to a state championship, then as state runners-up the following the season. He led Rogers High School (RI) to a state championship in 1952. He died in 1966 from a heart attack.

References

1912 births
1966 deaths
American men's basketball players
Basketball players from Indiana
Guards (basketball)
High school basketball coaches in Indiana
Indianapolis Kautskys players
Notre Dame Fighting Irish men's basketball players
Sportspeople from Lafayette, Indiana